Sidney Lau Sek-cheung (died 1987) was a Cantonese teacher in the Chinese Language Section of the Government Training Division and Principal of the Government Language School  of the Hong Kong Government.  He had graduated bachelor of arts from Sun Yat-sen University, Guangdong, People's Republic of China.

Texts
Lau wrote a series of textbooks in the 1960s and 1970s, for teaching Anglophones to speak Cantonese.  The textbooks were initially used for teaching western expatriates working in the Hong Kong Police Force and other government bodies. Later the texts were used as a basis for a radio teaching programme for foreigners.

Lau's books introduced his own romanisation system which differs from the widely used Yale system and the nine other identified predecessors by using superscripted numbers to indicate the tones of the words, a method copied 16 years later by the creators of the little used but academically favoured Jyutping. The third system in general use in Hong Kong after Lau and Yale is the Hong Kong Government or "Standard Romanisation" system developed by James D Ball and Ernst J Eitel, and upon which Lau's was largely based.

Lau's A Practical Cantonese-English Dictionary, with 22,000 Cantonese entries, was published by the Hong Kong government in 1977, and reviewed favorably by Dew in the Journal of Chinese Linguistics.

Current use
Despite five decades since publication, the books remain popular, being among the few comprehensive courses teaching spoken Cantonese (as opposed to written Chinese and spoken Mandarin, which are significantly different).

See also 

 Sidney Lau romanisation, a Romanisation system for Cantonese

References

External links
Explanation of Sidney Lau's Cantonese Romanization System

Year of birth missing
1987 deaths
Hong Kong educators
Linguists from China
Sun Yat-sen University alumni
Cantonese language